Alderman Walter Leslie Dingley OBE (12 January 1892 – 1980), was an agricultural merchant, analytical chemist and a British Liberal Party politician.

Background
He was born in Handsworth, Staffordshire, the son of Alfred Dingley and Maud Mary Jackson. In 1918 he married Norah Catherine Wheeler. They had two sons. In 1954 he was made an Officer of the Order of the British Empire in the Queen's 1954 Birthday Honours for services to Hospital Boards in Birmingham. He died in 1980 at Stratford-upon-Avon, Warwickshire.

Professional career
He served in World War One with the Cheshire regiment and in the Royal Flying Corps and reached the rank of captain. He was an agricultural merchant and analytical chemist at Stratford-on-Avon.

Political career
In 1927 he was elected as a Councillor to Warwickshire County Council. He was selected Liberal candidate for the Warwick and Leamington division of Warwickshire for the 1929 General Election. This was a Unionist seat where the Liberals were usually the main or only challenger. In 1929 Labour decided to contest the seat which probably removed any hope he had of winning;

In 1931, he complained that the local education curriculum was not practical enough and said a knowledge of binding machines would be useful in rural areas.
He was re-selected as Liberal prospective candidate for Warwick and Leamington but at the 1931 General Election, following the formation of the National Government, he withdrew in favour of the incumbent Conservative candidate. He was selected Liberal candidate for the Hereford division of Herefordshire for the 1935 General Election. The seat had been won by a Liberal in 1929 but re-gained by a Conservative in 1931. Any hope he had of winning was undermined by the intervention of a Labour party candidate;

He was appointed a Warwickshire County Alderman. He was selected as Liberal prospective parliamentary candidate for the Warwick and Leamington, the seat he fought in the 1929 General Election. In fact, the Liberals had not contested the seat since 1929. A general election was expected to take place in 1939 but was postponed due to the outbreak of war. He served as Chairman of the County Council. In 1944 he noted that the council’s request for policewomen hadn’t been answered. The clerk replied that the chief constable had “done everything he could to find five but had failed”. He was re-adopted as Liberal candidate when the elections finally came around after the war ended in 1945. However, against a popular and well known Conservative opponent and a resurgent Labour party, he was well beaten;

He did not stand for parliament again.

See also 
1954 Birthday Honours
Hereford (UK Parliament constituency)
Warwick and Leamington (UK Parliament constituency)

References

1892 births
1980 deaths
British Army personnel of World War I
Military personnel from Staffordshire
Liberal Party (UK) parliamentary candidates
People from Handsworth, West Midlands
Cheshire Regiment soldiers
Royal Flying Corps officers